The Bongaigaon Refinery & Petrochemicals Ltd. (BRPL) now IOCL, Bongaigaon Refinery (BGR) is a petroleum refinery company in India. It was incorporated on 20 February 1974 by the government of India.

The company began with initial funds of Rs. 50 crore (Rs. 500 million), which was increased to Rs. 200 crore by December 1983. The total paid capital of the company was Rs. 199.82 crore as of 31 March 2005.

The Government of India held the entire paid-up capital of the Company until 1990-91, but sold 25.54% of its shareholding to the public during 1991-92 to 1993-94. The remaining equity of 74.46% was divested in favor of the Indian Oil Corporation Ltd. on 29 March 2001. As a result, BRPL became a subsidiary company of the Indian Oil Corporation Ltd., a Government owned corporation.

In 25 March 2009 BRPL merged with Indian Oil Corporation Limited (IOCL) to become its eight largest refinery and came to be known as Bongaigaon Refinery (BGR).

External links 
 Bongaigaon Refinery and Petrochemicals Ltd

Oil and gas companies of India
Bongaigaon
Government-owned companies of India
Energy in Assam
Companies based in Assam
Petrochemical companies of India
1974 establishments in Assam
Indian companies established in 1974
Indian companies disestablished in 2010
Energy companies established in 1974